Timmins is a provincial electoral district in Ontario, Canada. It elects one member to the Legislative Assembly of Ontario. This riding was established from the urban portion of the former riding of Timmins—James Bay on the recommendation of the Far North Electoral Boundaries Commission in 2017. The remainder of Timmins—James Bay became the Mushkegowuk—James Bay riding. The riding mirrors the boundaries of the city of Timmins.

Members of Provincial Parliament

Election results

References

External links
Map of riding for 2018 election

Ontario provincial electoral districts
Politics of Timmins